Health and Social Care Act may refer to.

United Kingdom legislation
Health and Social Care (Community Health and Standards) Act 2003
Smoking, Health and Social Care (Scotland) Act 2005
Health and Social Care Act 2008
Health and Social Care Act 2012
(Note: An Act with this short title will have been known as a Health and Social Care Bill during its passage through Parliament)

See also
Health and Care Bill 2021
List of short titles